Medea in Corinto (Medea in Corinth) is an 1813 opera in Italian by the composer Simon Mayr. It takes the form of a melodramma tragico in two acts. The libretto, by Felice Romani, is based on the Greek myth of Medea and the plays on the theme by Euripides and Pierre Corneille. The same subject had formed the basis for Luigi Cherubini's famous opera Médée (1797) which may have had an influence on Mayr's work. Medea in Corinto was first performed at the Teatro San Carlo in Naples on 28 November 1813 and was Mayr's greatest theatrical success.

Roles

Synopsis

Act 1
Jason (Giasone) has rejected his former wife, Medea, in favour of Creusa, daughter of King Creon (Creonte) of Corinth. Creon banishes Medea from the city and she swears revenge. Meanwhile, King Aegeus (Egeo) of Athens arrives in Corinth. He had been promised Creusa as his bride. Finding he has been rejected, he makes a pact with Medea. As Jason and Creusa are being married in the temple, Medea bursts in with Aegeus's soldiers and a fight breaks out as they attempt to carry off the bride and bridegroom.

Act 2
Creon's men have defeated and captured Medea and Aegeus. In prison, Medea uses her magic powers to summon up demons from the underworld. She kills Creusa with a poisoned robe then stabs her own – and Jason's – children to death, before making her escape in a chariot pulled by flying dragons. In despair, Jason attempts suicide in vain.

Recordings
 Marisa Galvany, Joan Patenaude, Molly Stark, Allen Cathcart, Robert White, Thomas Palmer, Clarion Concerts, conducted by Newell Jenkins (Vanguard, 1969)
Leyla Gencer, William Johns, Gianfranco Casarini, Gianfranco Pastine, Cecilia Fusco, Luigi Paolillo, Ivana Cavallini, Ermanno Lorenzi, Teatro San Carlo Orchestra and Chorus, conducted by Maurizio Arena (Myto Records, 1977)
 Jane Eaglen, Yvonne Kenny, Bruce Ford, Raúl Giménez, Alistair Miles, Philharmonia Orchestra, conducted by David Parry (Opera Rara, 1997)
 Elżbieta Szmytka, Evelyn Pollock, Mark Milhofer, Lawrence Brownlee, Wojtek Gierlach, Sinfonieorchester & Chorus Theater St Gallen, conducted by David Stern (oehms classics, 2010)
 Nadja Michael, Ramón Vargas, Alastair Miles, Alek Shrader, Elena Tsallagova, Bavarian State Opera, conducted by Ivor Bolton, stage directed by Hans Neuenfels (Arthaus DVD, 2010)

Sources
 The Viking Opera Guide ed. Amanda Holden (Viking, 1993)
 Del Teatro (in Italian)

External links
 

1813 operas
Italian-language operas
Libretti by Felice Romani
Opera world premieres at the Teatro San Carlo
Operas
Operas based on Medea (Euripides play)
Operas based on plays
Operas based on works by Pierre Corneille
Operas by Simon Mayr
Operas set in ancient Greece